Tropidonophis novaeguineae, the New Guinea keelback, is a species of colubrid snake. It is found in New Guinea.

References

Tropidonophis
Reptiles of Indonesia
Snakes of New Guinea
Reptiles described in 1911
Taxa named by Theodorus Willem van Lidth de Jeude